Gladys Jeannette Suriano Palacios (born 26 December 1985) is a Guatemalan retired footballer who played as a midfielder. She has been a member of the Guatemala women's national team.

International career
Suriano capped for Guatemala at senior level during the 2010 CONCACAF Women's World Cup Qualifying (and its qualification), the 2010 Central American and Caribbean Games and the 2012 CONCACAF Women's Olympic Qualifying Tournament qualification. She was also called for the 2012 CONCACAF Women's Olympic Qualifying Tournament, but did not play.

References

1985 births
Living people
Guatemalan women's footballers
Guatemala women's international footballers
Women's association football midfielders